The Peugeot 508 is a mid-size/large family car produced by the French automaker Peugeot, and followed by the 508 SW, an estate version, in 2011.

Production of the 508 began in 2010 as an indirect replacement for the 407 and 607, for which no direct replacement was scheduled. It shares its platform and most engine options with the second generation Citroën C5: the two cars are produced alongside one another at the company's Rennes Plant, and in Wuhan, China, for sales inside China. 

At the end of 2015, Peugeot launched the new generation of 508, 508 SW and RXH. The front of the car was redesigned and full LED headlights became available. New engines were also launched, and front-wheel drive introduced for the RXH. The Peugeot 508 has received several international awards including Car of the Year 2011 in Spain (awarded 2012), Next Green Car, and Best Large Family Car 2011. Citations commented on the car "being spacious and well equipped" and that it "represented excellent build quality and has the best fuel economy in its class" (Peugeot 508 1.6 e HDi 109g CO2/km) or also Auto Zeitung Best Imported Family Car 2011 (readers' votes).

The Peugeot 508 was given a facelift in 2015, with the introduction of a vertical grille with the Peugeot lion in the centre. The new second-generation Peugeot 508 won the "Most Beautiful Car of The Year 2018" award at the International Automobile Festival, where the Peugeot E-Legend also won "The Most Beautiful Concept Car of The Year".

First generation (W23; 2010)

Overview
Compared to the Peugeot 407, the 508 has a shorter front overhang and a longer rear passenger compartment.

After a few initial leaked spyshots, the first definitive details and images leaked to the web on 12 July 2010. Peugeot released additional information on 6 September 2010. The 508 was officially launched at the 2010 Paris Motor Show. PSA Peugeot Citroën build the 508 in China in partnership with Dongfeng Motor. It was launched there on 10 August 2011.

It was reported in 2011 that Peugeot expected China to be the largest market for the car, at almost twice that of France. If predictions were correct, it would be the first time that the company sold more units in any country other than France for any model that is available in Europe.

Technical highlights
Peugeot has equipped the 508 for the market in Europe with its HDI common rail diesel engines.

Though this matches the Volkswagen Passat Bluemotion, it features a slightly larger fuel tank which allows it to cover a slightly longer range of 1637 kilometres (1017 miles). At least two e HDI engines were available from 2011 to 2012. The first engines had an emission level of 114 g/km. The later model reduces emissions to 109 g/km. A modified air intake is the main reason for the improvement.

It comes mated solely to a six speed torque converter automatic gearbox which offers manual shifts via paddles or a central selector.

Safety
From a system which rates to a maximum of five stars, the 508 received a five star rating by Euro NCAP in 2011. The score was:

508 RXH

At the 2011 Frankfurt Motor Show, Peugeot revealed a hybrid-electric crossover estate de luxe variant of the 508. To distinguish it from other 508 models, the RXH features flared wheel arches, as well as a new color-coded grille with three columns of LED daytime running lights on each side. 

The Hybrid4 powertrain combines a 120 kW (163hp) 2.0-litre HDi FAP diesel engine with a 27 kW (37hp) electric motor to lower fuel consumption to 4.2 L/100 km. The powertrain offers four working modes:

AUTO, in which the vehicle strives for the best fuel economy, throttle response is slow and the automated manual transmission shifts early, furthermore the vehicle switches to ZEV mode as often as possible. 

SPORT mode offers a combined power output of 150kW (200hp) and 450Nm at speeds up to 120km/h, throttle response is very aggressive and the engine revs up to 4000RPM before upshifts.

4WD mode keeps the HDi engine running constantly and charging the high voltage battery to offer constant 4WD at speeds up to 120km/h. 

ZEV mode is available if the high voltage battery is at least 1/3 full. In this mode, the vehicle moves only via the rear electric motor and the performance is limited. ZEV mode is available at speeds of up to ~60km/h with moderate acceleration, the range on a full charge is about ~2miles (~3km), the A/C compressor is automatically switched off in this mode. If the driver presses the accelerator beyond a certain point, the HDi engine restarts automatically as to offer better acceleration and the vehicle goes to AUTO mode. Auto Start Stop is available in all modes except for 4WD when the engine is constantly running so that the reversible alternator can top up the battery and provide constant rear drive. 

The engine automatically shuts down whenever possible (cruising downhill at speeds of up to 85km/h when the battery is not fully charged or cruising on a level surface at speeds of up to ~60km/h), when coming to a stop the HDi engine shuts down at speeds below 30km/h. Restarting can occur at any moment, if the HYbrid4 control unit determines that additional power is needed; or the battery needs to be topped up; or the A/C compressor needs to kick in. 

The engine also restarts when the battery is fully charged and the vehicle is going downhill, as to offer additional engine braking, no fuel is used in this mode, but ZERO EMISSION is not displayed, as the HDi engine is rotating. The battery consist of 42 packs of four D-size SANYO batteries (201.6V nominal, ranging from 168V to 250V during use). To offer a longer battery pack life the HCU (hybrid control unit) never charges the batteries over 90% of their capacity, nor discharges them under 30%.

The 508 RXH HYbrid4 also has raised ground clearance of 184mm - 30mm more than the standard 508 SW and 508 HYbrid4.

The RXH was released in the beginning of 2012. The 508 RXH was launched in a single high spec limited edition version, before a full range became available. It is competing with the Audi A4 Allroad, the Volvo XC70, the Passat Alltrack or even more, the BMW 3 Series XDrive.

508 coupé by Peugeot

A concept "hybrid power" car prefiguring the style of the future 508 coupé, called the Peugeot SR1, was presented at the Geneva Motor Show in March 2010.

Sources reported that the Peugeot SR1 would go on sale in 2012.

The Peugeot 508 has been equipped 1.8 THP engines, which is only sold in China.

Gallery
Pre-facelift styling

Post facelift styling

Second generation (R83; 2018)

A second generation was announced by Peugeot in February 2018, and was officially unveiled at the Geneva Motor Show in March 2018. The estate version was rumoured in May 2018, announced in June and was officially unveiled at the 2018 Paris Motor Show. The design is inspired by the Instinct shooting brake concept, shown at the 2017 Geneva Motor Show.

In terms of powertrain options, the new 508 will have petrol engine options, both 1.6 litre PureTech turbocharged engines, with different power outputs; and three turbodiesel options. The automatic transmission has been updated to an eight speed Aisin EAT8 unit, replacing the older EAT6 units. A plug-in hybrid version was revealed in September 2019.

In May 2019, the 508 debuted in the market in the Middle East, featuring the carryover 165 hp 1.6 litre engine, and the six speed automatic of the previous generation.

508L
The Peugeot 508L premiered at the 2018 Guangzhou Auto Show in China. Compared to the European 508 model, the 508L exclusive to China has a 55mm (2.16 inch) longer wheelbase, making the length of the 508L wheelbase 2848 mm (112.12 inches). The Chinese 508L version is also 100 mm (4 inches) longer overall than the 508 sold in Europe, at 4870 mm (191.7 inches). 

Another difference between the two versions is in the rear with the five door liftback configuration of the European 508 being replaced by a conventional trunk, making the 508L a traditional four door sedan in China. Styling wise, the frameless door windows of the European 508 was cancelled for the 508L, and the tail lamps of the 508L was also downgraded into a design with a lower cost.

Engines

Safety 
From a system which rates to a maximum of 
five stars, the 508 received a five star rating by Euro NCAP in 2018. The score was:

Driving features

The Peugeot 508 includes various features.

The safety kit includes automatic emergency braking, adaptive cruise control, active blind spot detection including some steering correction to avoid an accident, speed and road sign recognition, automatic headlight beam selection and some driver-attention monitoring systems.

A windscreen camera is used to provide the features such as Active Lane Keeping Assistance and Road Edge Detection, speed sign recognition and Lane Positioning Assist, which can keep the car in the centre of the lane. 

The 508's Safety Plus Pack has sensors to watch areas out of the field of vision, to warn the driver by a LED.

The car has also parking aids, ranging from front and rear sensors up to fully automated assistance for both parallel and car park spaces.

508 PSE

In February 2020, Peugeot unveiled the 508 PSE (Peugeot Sport Engineered), available both in liftback and estate body styles.

The 508 PSE sales has been way under Peugeot sales target (5 to 6% of the 508 total sales). As of April 2022, only 2,000 units had been manufactured. In February 2023, the pre-facelift 508 PSE was discontinued.

508 Sport Engineered Concept
Unveiled in February 2019, and officially presented at the 2019 Geneva Motor Show, this concept is a sporty plug in hybrid version of the 508. 

Its CO2 emissions are 49 g/km per the WLTP test cycle. It also gets a sportier bodykit to improve aerodynamics. This concept will spawn a similar sporty production model which will be available, both as a saloon and an estate, in the second half of 2020.

Facelift
Unveiled on February 24, 2023, the facelift features a revised front end that includes the brand's new logo alongside a new infotainment system.

Sales and production

References

External links
 Official UK 508 website
 Official UAE 508 website
 EuroNCAP test
 Peugeot Racks up Awards to Start 2019
 Peugeot 508 RXH dimensions
 A BRIEF LOOK AT THE NEW PEUGEOT 508

508
Mid-size cars
Sedans
Station wagons
Front-wheel-drive vehicles
Euro NCAP large family cars
Cars introduced in 2010
Cars of China
Plug-in hybrid vehicles
2020s cars